Francis Webb may refer to:
 Francis Webb (engineer) (1836–1906), British engineer
 Francis Webb (poet) (1925–1973), Australian poet
 Francis Webb (writer) (1735–1815), English writer
 Francis Cornelius Webb (1826–1873), English physician and medical writer

See also
 Francis Webb Sheilds (1820–1906), Australian civil engineer